Hudløs himmel is a 1986 novel by Norwegian author Herbjørg Wassmo. It won the Nordic Council's Literature Prize in 1987.

References

1986 novels
20th-century Norwegian novels
Norwegian-language novels
Nordic Council's Literature Prize-winning works